The Efpalinos Tunnel is a tunnel on the Athens-Corinth section of the Olympia Odos motorway. Works began in 1999 as part of the construction of the Kakia Skala pass, one of the most dangerous road parts in Greece, with motorway standards. It was one of the first tunnels of the motorway, and it was the longest tunnel of it until the Panagopoula Tunnel became operational in 2017. It was opened to traffic in July 2004, along with the rest of the motorway segment in time for the Athens Olympics.

References

Attica
Road tunnels in Greece
Tunnels completed in 2004
2004 establishments in Greece